Established in 1991, one of Turkey's first private television channels, Show TV, on June 6, 2013 has been acquired by Ciner Media Group.

The channel's personalities include Ece Erken, Defne Samyeli, Gülben Ergen, Bülent Ersoy, Ferhat Göçer, Ece Üner, Reha Muhtar, Serdar Ortaç, Demet Akbağ, Mehmet Ali Erbil, Volkan Konak, Alişan, Hülya Avşar, Acun Ilıcalı, Seda Sayan and Çağla Şıkel. The channel also aired successful Turkish television series like Kurtlar Vadisi, Doktorlar, Adını Feriha Koydum, and Muhteşem Yüzyıl.

Turkish television series 
 Acı Hayat (2005–2007)
 Adını Feriha Koydum (2011–2012)
 Alev Alev (Flames of Fate) (2020–2021)
 Asla Vazgeçmem (2015–2016)
 Aşk Laftan Anlamaz (2016–2017)
 Aşk Ağlatır (2019)
 Cennet Mahallesi (2004–2007)Kış Güneşi (2016)
 Çukur (2017–2021)
 Çarpışma (2018–2019)
 Dadı (2000–2002)
 Deli Yürek (1999–2001)
 Doktorlar (2006–2011)
 Ezel (2009)
 Gülperi (2018–2019)
 İçerde (2016–2017)
 İçimizden Biri (2021–present)
 Kurtlar Vadisi (2003–2005)
 Kurtlar Vadisi Pusu (2007–2009)
 Kuzey Yildızı İlk Aşk (2019-2021)
 Kirmizi Kamyon (2021–present)
 Lale Devri Muhteşem Yüzyıl (2011)
 Ramo (2020–2021)
 Arıza (2020–2021)
 Sahte Prenses (2006)
 Servet (2018)
 Tatlı Hayat (2001–2003)
 Üç Kuruş (2021–present)
 Zemheri (2020)
 Sarhos Gibiyim (2022)

 Entertainment shows 
 Var mısın? Yok musun? (the Turkish version of Deal or No Deal)
 Kim 500 Milyar İster? (the first Turkish version of Who Wants to be a Millionaire?; 2000–2002)
 Kim 500 Bin İster? (the second Turkish version of Who Wants to be a Millionaire?; 2005–2007)
 Pazar Sürprizi Bu Tarz Benim (2014-2015)
 Şahane Show Yemekteyiz (the Turkish version of Come Dine with Me)
 Wipeout (Based On US game show Wipeout)
 Canlı Para (the Turkish version of The Million Pound Drop Live)
 MasterChef Survivor 
 Huysuz'la Dans Eder misin? (the Turkish version of So You Think You Can Dance)
 Yetenek Sizsiniz (the Turkish version of Got Talent)
 O Ses Turkiye (the Turkish version of The Voice)
 Bugün Ne Giysem?''

References

External links 

Show TV at LyngSat Address

Television stations in Turkey
Television channels and stations established in 1991
Küçükçekmece
Mass media in Istanbul